Madhu Goud Yaskhi (born 15 December 1960) was a member of the 14th Lok Sabha and 15th Lok Sabha of India. He represented the Nizamabad constituency of Telangana and is a member of the Indian National Congress (INC) political party.

He is a strong supporter for the formation of a new state in southern India, Telangana, for which the people are fighting to be carved out of the existing state of Andhra Pradesh and has popular support from the people of Telangana.

Early life
Madhu Yaskhi was born on 15 December 1960 to Kistaiah Goud and Sulochana. He is the second among six sisters and three brothers. He was adopted by his father's younger brother Pochaiah Goud and Anasuya.

He has bachelor's degree in Arts from Nizam College, Hyderabad in 1982.  He also obtained an LLB from the University of Delhi in 1985 and LLM from P. G. College of Law, Hyderabad in 1989.

Career
Madhu Yaskhi was a New York City attorney. He established International Legal and Trade Consultants. This organization provides legal assistance to people of Indian origin. Moved by the plight of farmers committing suicides due to crop failures and high debts, he left USA and returned to India. He has a law firm in New York and Atlanta, still actively working through remote operations and few visits every few months

Political career
In 2004, Madhu Yaskhi was elected as a Member of Parliament from Nizamabad. In 2009, he was re-elected from the same constituency, and in 2014 defeated by K. Kavitha of Telangana Rashtra Samithi.

Positions held
 Elected as Member of Parliament to 14th Lok Sabha in 2004
 Active Member, House Committee on Subordinate Legislation from 2004
 Active Member, Committee on External & NRI Affairs from 2004
 Active Member, Consultative Committee on Civil Aviation from 2004
 Active Member, Consultative Committee on Defence (Permanent Invitee) from 2004
 Active Member, Committee on Estimates from 2004
 Acting as All India Congress Committee(A.I.C.C) secretary from 2007
 Also Active Member of Indian Council for World Affairs and Bureau of Indian Standards (ISI)
 Elected as Member of Parliament to 15th Lok Sabha in 2009
 Lost seat in 2014 to TRS.

Social service and charity 
He founded Madhu Yaskhi Foundation in 2003 and donates a portion of his income to the foundation to provide financial assistance to the poor farmers and educate their children up to 12th standard and also to provide health care facilities with the assistance of his wife Dr. Shuchee Yaskhi.

Awards 
 He was named NRI of the Year 2005 by NRIInternet.com.

References

External links

India MPs 2009–2014
India MPs 2004–2009
Indian National Congress politicians from Telangana
Politicians from Hyderabad, India
Telugu politicians
Living people
1960 births
Lok Sabha members from Andhra Pradesh
Osmania University alumni
Delhi University alumni
People from Nizamabad district